This page is a list of protest clubs that were created out of either sports fans, players, or club shareholders protesting the way the original club was treated or run. There are also clubs who have been created purely over arguments about who plays at a particular ground. The definition of it can also be used for a club protesting certain measures set out by a government or organisation

List

Association football

Other sporting codes

See also
Phoenix club, clubs which arise after the disbandment of a former club

References